Vellakkinar is a junction in Thalavay village in Thalavady Panchayath, Kuttanad Taluk, Alappuzha District, Kerala State. It derived its name because there was a water well (vellakkinar) at this junction. It is 11 km from Thiruvalla Railway Station. Haripad, Thakazhy, Ambalappuzha, Alappuzha are some of the nearest railway stations from the Vellakkinar. There is also another 'vellakkinar'  East to Collectorate Junction of Alleppey.

Schools

There are two schools in the village, Thalavady, a government vocational higher secondary school  and a UP School (ADUPS). Other amenities include Thalavady Post Office, AEO Office, Thalavady Water Tank, Ganapathy Temple. A tributary of the Pampa River  flows through the village.

References

Villages in Alappuzha district